The Dutch Eredivisie in the 1969–70 season was contested by 18 teams. Ajax won the championship. Feyenoord won the European Cup and therefore also qualified for that tournament as defending champions.

League standings

Results

See also
 1969–70 Eerste Divisie
 1969–70 Tweede Divisie

References

 Eredivisie official website - info on all seasons 
 RSSSF

Eredivisie seasons
Netherlands
1969–70 in Dutch football